Boat Harbour is a settlement in Newfoundland and Labrador, Canada. The community had a population of 73 in the 2021 census.

Populated places in Newfoundland and Labrador